The Moyle Hospital is a health facility in Gloucester Avenue, Larne, Northern Ireland. It is managed by the Northern Health and Social Care Trust.

History
The facility has its origins in the Larne Union Workhouse which was designed by George Wilkinson and was completed in October 1842. It became Larne District Hospital in 1929 and, after joining the National Health Service in 1948, became known as Moyle Hospital. X-Ray services were suspended at the hospital in January 2017.

References 

Northern Health and Social Care Trust
Hospitals established in 1842
1842 establishments in Ireland
Hospital buildings completed in 1842
Health and Social Care (Northern Ireland) hospitals
Hospitals in County Antrim
19th-century architecture in Northern Ireland